Cerro Chato (Plain Hill) is a town in central Uruguay that is divided in three parts belonging to Durazno Department, Florida Department, and Treinta y Tres Department.

Geography
The town is located along Route 7, northeast by road from Valentines and southwest of Santa Clara de Olimar.

History
On 8 January 1942, Cerro Chato was declared a "Pueblo" (village) by the Act of Ley Nº 10.112. Its status was elevated to "Villa" (town) by the Act of Ley Nº 13.299 on 17 November 1964.

Plebiscite of Cerro Chato of 1927

In 1927, a non-binding plebiscite took place in Cerro Chato to decide to which department it would belong: Durazno, Florida or Treinta y Tres. For this referendum, every citizen of the town was called to vote, including women. That was the first time in Latin America that women exercised the right to vote. The Department of Durazno won the plebiscite, but this result was not accepted by the authorities. Therefore, Cerro Chato still is split between the three departments.

Population
According to the 2004 census it had a total population of 3,227, of these 1,694 in Trenta y Tres, 1,124 in Durazno and 409 in Florida.
  
Source: Instituto Nacional de Estadística de Uruguay

Places of worship
 Sacred Heart of Jesus Parish Church (Roman Catholic)

References

External links

INE map of Cerro Chato

Populated places in the Treinta y Tres Department
Populated places in the Durazno Department
Populated places in the Florida Department